PRP may refer to:

Places
 People's Republic of Poland, 1952-1990
 Pleasure Ridge Park, Louisville, in Kentucky, United States
 Preston Park railway station, in Sussex, England

Medicine and biology
 Panretinal photocoagulation, a treatment for proliferative diabetic retinopathy
 Penicillin-resistant pneumococci, a Streptococcus species resistant to antibiotics
 Pityriasis rubra pilaris, a rare skin disorder
 Platelet-rich plasma
 Prion protein, a major constituent of the infectious prion
 Progressive rubella panencephalitis, a viral neurological disorder
 Proline rich proteins, a class of intrinsically unstructured proteins
 Psychological refractory period, a period between processing multiple stimuli

Mathematics and science
 Probable prime, a number that satisfies some requirements for prime numbers
 Parallel Redundancy Protocol, a network protocol providing fault tolerance
 Pseudorandom permutation, a class of functions in cryptography
 Petroleum Remediation Product, a substance for cleaning petroleum-based pollution

Organizations
 Press Recognition Panel, a UK body relating to the recognition of press regulators
 Peel Regional Police, in Ontario, Canada
 Park Royal Partnership, an industrial partnership in London
 Puerto Rico Police

Political parties
 Praja Rajyam Party, in India between 2008-2011
 Progressive Reform Party (South Africa), between 1975-1977
 Portuguese Republican Party, between 1876-1911
 Progressive Reform Party (Suriname), in South America
 Patriotic Renewal Party, in Honduras between 1990-1992
 People's Reconciliation Party in Burundi, Africa
 People's Reform Party in the Philippines
 Progressive Republican Party (Brazil)

Other uses
 Performance-related pay
 Personnel Reliability Program, a psychological evaluation of US DoD personnel
 Potentially responsible party, a possible polluter who may be held liable
 Professional registered parliamentarian